Leptascospora is a genus of fungi within the Meliolaceae family. This is a monotypic genus, containing the single species Leptascospora uredinis.

References

External links
Leptascospora at Index Fungorum

Meliolaceae
Monotypic Sordariomycetes genera